The Hangover is the second solo album by the former Guns N' Roses guitarist Gilby Clarke, released in 1997. Clem Burke and Eric Singer played on the album.

Critical reception
The Hartford Courant called the album "pretty dull stuff best suited for Harley dudes." Guitar Player wrote: "A devotee of the New York Dolls and T Rex, Gilby goes straight for the jugular on 'Punk Rock Pollution', a sarcastic swipe at three-chord wannabes."

AllMusic deemed the album "an endearing collection of hard rock indebted to glam, sleazy boogie and blues-rock."

Track listing
All tracks by Clarke unless otherwise stated.

 "Wasn't Yesterday Great" – 2:45
 "It's Good Enough for Rock N' Roll" – 3:12
 "Zip Gun" – 3:17
 "Higher" – 3:20
 "Mickey Marmalade" – 3:17
 "Blue Grass Mosquito" – 3:24
 "Happiness Is a Warm Gun" (John Lennon, Paul McCartney) – 2:56
 "Hang on to Yourself" (David Bowie) – 2:29
 "The Worst" – 3:39
 "Captain Chaos" – 5:12
 "Punk Rock Pollution" – 2:29

Personnel

Gilby Clarke - lead vocals, guitars, bass, mellotron, drums
Waddy Wachtel - guitars
Ryan Roxie - guitars
Teddy Andreadis - piano, Hammond organ, harmonica
C.J. DeVillar - bass, backing vocals
Will Effertz - bass, backing vocals
Phil Soussan - bass
Clem Burke - drums
Sandy Chila - drums, percussion
Mike Fasano - drums
Eric Singer - drums
Roberta Freeman - backing vocals
Ovis - backing vocals, horns
Kyle Vincent - backing vocals
Jason Alt - backing vocals

References

Gilby Clarke albums
1997 albums